Sheldon John Burnside (born December 22, 1954) is a former Major League Baseball player who pitched for the Detroit Tigers and the Cincinnati Reds.

Burnside was born in South Bend, Indiana but moved to the Greater Toronto Area at about five months old when his father, Bernard, went into business there. At about 12 years old, he began living in Etobicoke, Ontario. Burnside attended Michael Power High School in Etobicoke, which did not have a baseball team, but played for a local semi-professional team. His performance with that team earned him a tryout with the Detroit Tigers who subsequently signed him.

He debuted on September 4, 1978, with the Tigers against the New York Yankees. His debut was rough as he pitched  of an inning while giving up three hits, two base on balls and four earned runs. On October 25, 1979, he was traded by the Tigers to the Reds for Champ Summers. His last appearance was in 1980 for Cincinnati.

References

External links

1954 births
Living people
Cincinnati Reds players
Detroit Tigers players
Lakeland Tigers players
Indianapolis Indians players
Bristol Tigers players
Evansville Triplets players
Montgomery Rebels players
Major League Baseball pitchers
Baseball players from Indiana
American emigrants to Canada
Baseball people from Ontario
Sportspeople from Etobicoke